Prying Eyes is the second studio album by Portland, Maine hardcore punk band Cruel Hand. It was released in 2008 on Bridge 9 Records.

Critical reception
Exclaim! called the album "a terrific stab at first-gen hardcore featuring echoing bass, shifts between menacing mid-tempos and testosterone-fueled blasts of furiousness, and a slightly updated feel thanks to crisp production and more guttural vocals accented by backgrounds."

Track listing

References

2008 albums
Cruel Hand albums
Bridge 9 Records albums